Regional elections will be held in Spain in 2023 to elect the regional parliaments of twelve of the seventeen autonomous communities—Aragon, Asturias, the Balearic Islands, the Canary Islands, Cantabria, Castilla–La Mancha, Extremadura, La Rioja, Madrid, Murcia, Navarre and the Valencian Community. 737 of 1,212 seats in the regional parliaments were up for election, as well as the 50 seats in the regional assemblies of Ceuta and Melilla. The elections will be held simultaneously with local elections all throughout Spain.

Election date
Determination of election day vary depending on the autonomous community, with each one having competency to establish its own regulations. Typically, thirteen out of the seventeen autonomous communities—all but Andalusia, the Basque Country, Catalonia and Galicia—had their elections fixed for the fourth Sunday of May every four years, to be held together with nationwide local elections.

In some cases, regional presidents have the prerogative to dissolve the regional parliament and call for extra elections at a different time, but newly elected assemblies are restricted to serving out what remained of their previous four year-terms without altering the period to their next ordinary election. In other cases—namely, Aragon, the Balearic Islands, Castile and León, Extremadura, Navarre and the Valencian Community—, the law grants presidents the power to call a snap election resulting in fresh four year-parliamentary terms. By the time of the 2023 regional elections, this prerogative had been exercised by Castile and León by holding a snap regional election on 13 February 2022.

Regional governments
The following table lists party control in autonomous communities and cities. Gains for a party are highlighted in that party's colour.

References

External links
www.juntaelectoralcentral.es (in Spanish). Central Electoral Commission – Regional elections
www.argos.gva.es (in Spanish). Argos Information Portal – Electoral Historical Archive
www.historiaelectoral.com (in Spanish and Catalan). Electoral History – Regional elections since 1980

2023
 
May 2023 events in Spain